Diva X Machina 3 is a various artists compilation album released in 2000 by COP International. The compilation peaked at #19 on the CMJ RPM charts in the U.S.

Reception
In reviewing Diva X Machina 3, Elektronski Zvuk noted the popularity of the series and Hexedene as a standout of the collection. Alex Steininger of In Music We Trust called the album a "a powerful, seductive breath of life that will allow you to never look at the originals in the same light again."

Track listing

Personnel
Adapted from the Diva X Machina 3 liner notes.

 Kim Hansen (as Kim X) – compiling
 Nadine – cover art, illustrations Stefan Noltemeyer – mastering
 Christian Petke (as Count Zero) – compiling, design

Release history

References

External links 
 Diva X Machina 3 at Discogs (list of releases)

2000 compilation albums
COP International compilation albums